Rhodesia is a village and civil parish in the Bassetlaw district of Nottinghamshire, England. At the 2011 Census, the population of the civil parish was 982.

The village was built in 1920, near the small established settlement of Haggonfield, to provide housing for coal miners working at the nearby Shireoaks and Steetley pits. It was named after G. Preston Rhodes, then chairman of Shireoaks Colliery. Tylden Road, the main road through the village, was named after the pit's first manager. There are no longer any active mines in the area. 

Rhodesia consists of just over 300 houses, a pub at Woodend, one shop, a school and a village hall. Part of the village is bordered by the Chesterfield Canal and it is also adjacent to the A57. Rhodesia is located between Shireoaks and Retford railway stations, the Robin Hood Line passes through the village.

References

External links 

 Entry on the Village Parish of Rhodesia, Nottinghamshire

Villages in Nottinghamshire
Civil parishes in Nottinghamshire
Bassetlaw District